Nipputo Chelagaatam is a 1982 Telugu language action drama film directed by Kommineni Seshagiri Rao and produced by Y. V. Rao. The film stars Krishnam Raju, Sharada, Jayasudha and Sarath Babu. The film is a remake of 1978 Bollywood film Karmayogi. The music was composed by Chellapilla Satyam.

Cast
Krishnam Raju as Shankar/Mohan (Dual role)
Sharada as Durga Devi
Jayasudha as Rekha
Sarath Babu as Ravi
Geetha as Radha
Kavita as Kavita
Kanta Rao as Radha's father;
Rao Gopal Rao as Jagapati
Allu Rama Lingaiah as Gajapati
Vijayachander as church father
Sarathi as Police Inspector
Balakrishna as constable
Chidatala Appa Rao

Soundtrack

References

External links
 

1982 films
1980s Telugu-language films
Indian crime drama films
Indian action drama films
1980s crime drama films
1980s action drama films
Films scored by Satyam (composer)
Telugu remakes of Hindi films
Films set in Mumbai
Films shot in Mumbai
Films directed by Kommineni Seshagiri Rao
1982 drama films